Cunha is a Galician and Portuguese surname of toponymic origin, documented since the 13th century.

Notable people having this surname include:

Alvito D'Cunha, Indian footballer 
Antonius Kelly Da Cunha, GM Programming of antv Indonesia
Diego Ribas da Cunha, Brazilian international footballer
Domingos da Cunha, the Cabrinha, Portuguese Jesuit painter, early 17th century.
Eduardo Cunha, former president of the Brazilian Chamber of Deputies 2015–2016 and removed from office for lying about his Swiss bank accounts
Euclides da Cunha, Brazilian journalist, sociologist and engineer.
Gerson da Cunha (c.1927–2022), Indian actor
João Cunha, Brazilian jiu-jitsu practitioner
João Cunha (footballer) (born 1996), Portuguese footballer
José Gerson da Cunha (1844–1903); Indo-Portuguese physician, orientalist, historian and numismatist
Dom Luís da Cunha, (1662 - 1749), Portuguese diplomat
Leander D'Cunha, Indian footballer 
Lix da Cunha, Brazilian engineer, architect, developer
Marco Aurélio Cunha dos Santos, better known as Marco Aurélio (born 1967), Brazilian footballer.
Maria do Carmo,  better known as "Carmen Miranda" da Cunha (1909–1955), singer, actress, dancer, world citizen.
Nani, real name Luis Cunha, Portuguese international footballer.
Nuno da Cunha, governor of Portuguese possessions in India from 1528 to 1538.
Osvaldo Rodrigues da Cunha, Brazilian herpetologist.
Samuel Lopes da Cunha, (1984) Brazilian footballer
Thiago Cunha, Brazilian–born East Timorese naturalisation footballer
Tristão da Cunha (1460–1540); Portuguese explorer and naval commander
Tristão de Bragança Cunha (1878–1938); Indian nationalist and anti-colonial activist from Goa
Neil D'Cunha, Indian Malayali cinematographer

Locations with the name Cunha include:

Cunha, São Paulo, a municipality in the state of São Paulo in Brazil.
Cunha Porã, a municipality in the state of Santa Catarina in the South region of Brazil.
Tristan da Cunha, a remote group of volcanic islands in the south Atlantic Ocean.

References 

Galician-language surnames
Portuguese-language surnames
Portuguese toponymic surnames
Galician toponymic surnames